Henrik Toft Hansen (born 18 December 1986) is a Danish handball player for Paris Saint-Germain and the Danish national team.

He is the younger brother of René Toft Hansen. He has three younger siblings: Allan Toft Hansen (da) of Mors-Thy Håndbold, Majbritt Toft Hansen of Viborg HK and Jeanette Toft Hansen. All five siblings play on the pivot position.

He is married to former Swedish national team player Ulrika Toft Hansen (formerly Ulrika Ågren), with whom he has two children.

Club career
Before transferring to Germany, he has played for Danish league sides HF Mors, AaB Håndbold, AG København and Bjerringbro-Silkeborg.
In 2013 he won the EHF Champions League with Hamburg.

International career
In 2008 Hansen's performances for AaB Håndbold earned him his first call-up for the Danish national team. He was a part of the team when it won the 2012 European Championship in Serbia, defeating the host nation in the final by 21–19.

Personal life
Henrik Toft Hansen is married to Swedish handballer Ulrika Toft Hansen. They became parents to a boy, Oliver, in November 2015 and to a girl, Ida in July 2018.

Honours
French Championship:
: 2019, 2020, 2021, 2022
French Cup:
: 2021, 2022
Danish Championship:
: 2012
German Championship
: 2016, 2017
: 2018
German Cup
: 2016, 2017
EHF Cup:
: 2015
EHF Champions League:
: 2013
Summer Olympics:
: 2016
European Championship:
: 2012
World Championship:
: 2013

References

External links

1986 births
Living people
Aalborg Håndbold players
SG Flensburg-Handewitt players
People from Skive Municipality
Danish male handball players
Handball-Bundesliga players
Expatriate handball players
Danish expatriate sportspeople in France
Danish expatriate sportspeople in Germany
Olympic handball players of Denmark
Handball players at the 2016 Summer Olympics
Medalists at the 2016 Summer Olympics
Olympic gold medalists for Denmark
Olympic medalists in handball
Handball players at the 2020 Summer Olympics
Medalists at the 2020 Summer Olympics
Olympic silver medalists for Denmark
Sportspeople from the Central Denmark Region